Streptomyces capparidis is a bacterium species from the genus of Streptomyces which has been isolated from the fruits of the caper bush Capparis spinosa in Urumqi in China.

See also 
 List of Streptomyces species

References

External links
Type strain of Streptomyces capparidis at BacDive -  the Bacterial Diversity Metadatabase

 

capparidis
Bacteria described in 2017